The Swedish Transport Agency is a Swedish government agency which is responsible for the regulation of rail, air, sea and road transport and its enforcement. It was formed on 1 January 2009, through a merger of several government agencies, including the Civil Aviation Administration, under the Ministry of Infrastructure.

It has its headquarters in Norrköping, Sweden.

2015 data leak

In September 2015, the Swedish Transport Agency (STA) decided to outsource the management of its database and other IT services to the IBM offices in the Czech Republic and Serbia.

The entire STA database was uploaded onto cloud servers belonging to these two companies, and some employees got full access to the database, as Sweden fired its IT technicians.

In March 2016 the Swedish Security Service realized what happened, and started an investigation, warning other government agencies that unauthorized foreigners were now in control of their IT systems after the STA had bypassed necessary security checks just to expedite the transition to the new IT system as they wanted to fire local IT staff.

Following this huge mishap, the STA's Director General  resigned, and authorities charged her in 2016. At the start of the month, a Swedish court found her guilty of negligence but the sentence passed down was ludicrous in the eyes of many citizens, with court docking half of her monthly salary as punishment.

"Given how much the establishment has got each other's backs, this sentence was roughly equivalent to life in prison for a common person on the street, meaning they must have done something really awful to get not just a guilty verdict, but actually be fined half a month's salary," Rick Falkvinge commented on the sentence.

According to Falkvinge, the leak exposed:

    The weight capacity of all roads as well as bridges (which is crucial for warfare, and gives a lot idea about what roads are intended to be used as wartime airfields).
    Names, photos, and home addresses of fighter pilots in the Air Force.
    Names, photos, and home addresses of everybody in a police register, which are believed to be classified.
    Names, photos, and residential addresses of all operators in the military's most secret units that are equivalent to the SAS or SEAL teams.
    Names, photos, and addresses of everybody in a witness relocation program, who has been given protected identity for some reasons.
    Type, model, weight, and any defects in all government and military vehicles, including their operator, which reveals a much about the structure of military support units.

References

External links

Swedish Transport Agency
Swedish Transport Agency 

Government agencies of Sweden
Transport organizations based in Sweden
Transport authorities of Sweden
2009 establishments in Sweden
Government agencies established in 2009